Sŏgwangryang station, or West Kwangryang station is a railway station in Kŭmgŏng-ri, Onch'ŏn county, Namp'o Special City, North Korea on the P'yŏngnam Line of the Korean State Railway.

History

References

Railway stations in North Korea